Breudher, also known as Brueder or Bloeder (pronounced as broo-dhuh), is a traditional Sri Lankan Dutch Burgher buttery yeast cake, baked in a fluted mould. A variation, Bleuda, Kueh Bleuda or Kue Bludder is also found in the Malacca Dutch Eurasian community and in Kochin, a city in the south-west of India.

The mould used to bake the Breudher is typically a heavy brass or iron mould with deep groves with a tube in the centre, so that when the cake is baked, it comes out in a grooved ring shape with a central cylindrical hole.

Each family has its own variation, but essentially the recipe for Breudher consists of butter, sugar, eggs, bread dough, milk, nutmeg and raisins/sultanas. The end product is a bread like cake with a slight yeasty taste.

Breudher is traditionally served at Christmas breakfast, and New Years Day, cut into slices, spread with butter and topped with Dutch Edam cheese or fruit, such as green skinned bananas.

The difference in the recipe between the Sri Lanka Dutch Burgher and the Malacca Dutch Eurasian community, is that the Malaccan version uses toddy (fermented sap from the flower of the coconut tree) instead of yeast. It is likely that toddy was used as a local substitute when yeast was difficult to source. In Kochin bakers use maida flour, ghee (instead of butter), candied orange peel, a blend of ground spices and serve it as a bread loaf. Traditionally the local Anglo-Indian community serve it as part of breakfast during a wake, seven days after a funeral.

Origin
Breudher originated from traditional Dutch Broeder cake. Breudher is a derivate of "the Dutch word, broeder, referring to the bag (broederzak) in which the cake is cooked.

Breudher is most likely to have originated from traditional Dutch breakfast cakes and breads, such as Ontbijtkoek or the German Kugelhupf. Singaporean food writer, Sylvia Tan, in Forgotten Foods and Mealtime Memories, published by the National Library Board believes that breudher is a derivate of "the Dutch word, brood-tulband, referring to the fluted turban-shaped mould used to make it". Brood-tulband literally translates to ‘bread turban’, a description of its peculiar shape. The flute turban shaped Breudher cake, has all the ingredients which were commonly used in Dutch East Indies households: butter, sugar, eggs and spices. The main feature which makes the Breudher cake, particular is its usage of nutmeg, some spices and egg yolks.

The Malacca Portuguese Eurasians claim it as originating from their community, which is said to be a traditional Malacca Portuguese cake. However, there was a significant emigration of Ceylonese Burghers to Malacca in the early 1900s who brought with them their food and customs, assimilating into the local Eurasian community.  It is generally concluded that "Breudher" originated from the Dutch and that the Portuguese "Blueda" is derived from the Dutch version.

See also
 Butter cake
 Pound cake
 Bundt cake
 Love cake
 Broeder

References

Cakes
Sri Lankan cuisine
Dutch words and phrases